The Prince Hall Mystic Cemetery, also known as the Prince Hall Cemetery, is a historic cemetery located on Gardner Street, Arlington, Massachusetts. It is said to be the only remaining African American Masonic cemetery in the United States.

The cemetery is a burial place for members of the Prince Hall Grand Lodge F & AM, founded by Prince Hall in Boston in 1776. Prince Hall Freemasonry was the first African American Masonic group in the United States. In 1864, Grand Master William B. Kendall deeded this site to his lodge. The cemetery was dedicated in 1868, and put in trust to be used exclusively as a Prince Hall Freemasonry burial ground. Records indicate it was in use until about 1897 when it fell into disuse.

As time passed it was forgotten until its rediscovery in 1987. It was rededicated in 1990, and added to the National Register of Historic Places in 1998. Today the cemetery is the last extant cemetery associated with Prince Hall Masons. It contains a small park with a monument. A 1988 survey found remains of the original gate and an obelisk.

Current use

Beginning in 1990, Masons from the Prince Hall Grand Lodge have held an annual ceremony on Memorial Day.  This features remarks by the Grand Matron and other Masonic representatives and has frequently included an address by the president of the Arlington Historical Society.

See also
 National Register of Historic Places listings in Arlington, Massachusetts

References

External links 

 Town of Arlington History Facts
 

Cemeteries on the National Register of Historic Places in Massachusetts
Prince Hall Freemasonry
Cemeteries in Middlesex County, Massachusetts
Buildings and structures in Arlington, Massachusetts
National Register of Historic Places in Arlington, Massachusetts
African-American cemeteries
Masonic cemeteries
Cemeteries established in the 1860s